My Green Fedora is a 1935 Warner Bros. Merrie Melodies animated short film directed by Friz Freleng. The short was released on May 4, 1935.

It features a song, "I'm Wearin' My Green Fedora," written by songwriters Al Sherman, Al Lewis, and Joseph Meyer specially for this short.

Plot
Peter Rabbit is assigned by his mother to babysit his baby brother Elmer. Peter reluctantly does so, though nothing he tries will stop his baby brother from crying. What works is Peter dressing in some old clothes, including a green fedora. He sings a song to match the hat. When Peter is not looking, a weasel snatches the baby and runs off to the tunnels underneath the house. Peter gives chase and manages to take care of both the weasel and Elmer with a garden hose.

See also
Looney Tunes and Merrie Melodies filmography (1929–1939)

References

External links

1935 films
1935 animated films
Fiction about child care occupations
Films scored by Bernard B. Brown
Films scored by Norman Spencer (composer)
Short films directed by Friz Freleng
Merrie Melodies short films
Animated films about rabbits and hares
1930s Warner Bros. animated short films